Ricord is a surname. Notable people with the surname include: 

Auguste Ricord (1911–1985), French heroin trafficker
Elizabeth Ricord (1788–1865), American educator
Elsie Alvarado de Ricord (1928–2005), Panamanian writer
Frederick William Ricord (1819–1897), American author
Jean Baptiste Ricord (1777–1837), French-American physician
John Ricord (1813–1861), American lawyer 
Philippe Ricord (1800–1889), French physician
Pyotr Ivanovich Ricord (1776–1855), Russian admiral